Arthur Ward Lindsey (1894, Council Bluffs, Iowa – 1963, Lancaster, Ohio) was an American entomologist.

Arthur Ward Lindsey was educated at Morningside College in Sioux City gaining his Bachelor of Arts in 1916. Collecting  butterflies from his youth, he published his first publication (The Butterflies of Woodbury County) in 1914.

For his PhD he studied the private Lepidoptera collection of William Barnes (1860-1930) in Decatur, Illinois. That began a friendship with James Halliday McDunnough (1877-1962) Barnes curator. In 1919, he argued his doctoral thesis entitled The Hesperioidea of America, North of Mexico. The same year, he replaced McDunnough, as Curator at Decatur a function he held until 1921. Barnes and Lindsey published  in the same year a revision of the Pterophoroidea. Lindsey was the main author.

After teaching at Morningside College, he became in 1922 Professor and Director of the Department of Zoology of Denison University in Granville, Ohio. He retained these functions until his retirement in 1960.

Lindsey was the author of many works on the Hesperioidea, including a revision of his thesis in 1931 under the title of Hesperiidae of North America with Roswell Carter Williams Jr (1869-1946) and Ernest Layton Bell (1876-1964). He was also the author of five books on Zoology as well as on  genetics and evolution. He also directed the publication, from 1945 to 1948 of the Annals of the Entomological Society of America. His collection  of 6, 000 specimens and 28 types is maintained by the Carnegie Museum of Natural History in Pittsburgh.

Publications

Textbook of Evolution and Genetics (1929)
The Hesperioidea of North America (1931)
The Problems of Evolution (1931)
A Textbook of Genetics (1932)
The Science of Animal Life (1939)
Principles of Organic Evolution (1952)

1894 births
1963 deaths
American entomologists
People from Council Bluffs, Iowa
Morningside University alumni
Denison University faculty
20th-century American zoologists